is a 1984 arcade boxing game by Nintendo. The sequel to Punch-Out!!, it follows the same format while adding several new features and characters. Along with punching, blocking and dodging, players also have the ability to duck. The also saves and displays the three fastest knockout times, while the game's difficulty is increased.

It introduces a number of new characters to the Punch-Out!! series, including Bear Hugger, Dragon Chan, Vodka Drunkenski (whose name was changed to Soda Popinski in later releases), Great Tiger, and Super Macho Man. Several of the new fighters use illegal moves, from wrestling or martial arts.

Gameplay

As in the original Punch-Out!!, the player assumes the role of a green-haired boxer (later recast as Little Mac in the 1987 Nintendo Entertainment System version), known by three initials, who works through the ranks of the WVBA (World Video Boxing Association).  During matches, the player's boxer is viewed from the rear as a wireframe so the opponents are visible to the player. The player must precisely time punches, dodges, and blocks in order to defeat the opposing boxer. Hints are given as to the opponent's next move by subtle eye changes, but the player must ultimately predict what moves the opponent will make and react appropriately. Mostly, the opponent's eyes turn yellow before attacking, as well as winding up. Like in the previous arcade game, if the player loses, the opponent will glide up and laugh, with their stun animation and their neutral animation being reused.

Once the player defeats the final opponent, the player will win the Heavyweight Belt, then defend it against the same characters that have already been beaten. Each successive time they are met, the opponents are harder and quicker. In order to win a bout, the player must knock out the opponent within one 3-minute round; failure to do so results in an automatic loss. A technical knockout is awarded if either fighter is knocked down three times, but the opponent will sometimes fail to rise after the first or second knockdown.

The arcade game is housed in a modified upright cabinet. Like the previous game, it requires two vertically stacked monitors. The top monitor is used to display statistics while the bottom one is the main game display. It is otherwise a standard upright arcade cabinet.  It has a joystick and three buttons. Two buttons control left and right punches, one for each arm. One button delivers a strong uppercut or right hook, but it only works when the super meter (also known as the KO meter or power meter) is full. The super meter (an early version of the super meter used in modern fighting games) is filled by landing successful punches. It is drained when the player fails to block or dodge an attack, or if the player is knocked down. Unlike the original, Super Punch Out!! also features a joystick which can be pulled straight up from the panel, allowing the player to duck opponents' punches.

Development 
The game was developed by Nintendo R&D3, with development led by Genyo Takeda. Shigeru Miyamoto, due to his increasing responsibilities with the Famicom, had a smaller role for the sequel, aiding artists with their concept images. Takeda held brainstorming sessions with R&D3 on how to improve on Punch-Out, but initially had difficulties coming up with ideas within the rules of boxing. Takeda said they "did everything we could do with boxing," so the "only thing we could do was to include illegal moves, and that's why we made it so anything goes and had characters who would kick or were like martial artists, and that became Super Punch-Out!!"

Reception 
In Japan, Game Machine listed Super Punch-Out!! on their November 15, 1984 issue as being the third most-successful upright arcade unit of the month.

In the United States, the U.S. National Video Game Team selected Super Punch-Out as the best game at the AMOA Expo show in October 1984, and as one of the six games to be played in the 1985 national video games competition. Team member Phil Britt said the "inclusion of world records and the increased difficulty make it more" playable.

Other releases

Frank Bruno's Boxing

An unlicensed version of it was released in 1985 for the Commodore 64, the ZX Spectrum, the Amstrad CPC, and in 1986 for the Commodore 16 and Commodore Plus/4  titled Frank Bruno's Boxing. It was developed and published by Elite Systems exclusively in Europe. Instead of the nameable wireframe boxer, real-life boxer Frank Bruno stars as the protagonist of the game. Only the first three opponents of the Super Punch-Out!! arcade are included in the game; however, their names were changed. Bear Hugger was renamed "Canadian Crusher", Dragon Chan was renamed "Fling Long Chop", and Vodka Drunkenski was renamed "Andra Puncharedov". Five exclusive characters were added to the game: Tribal Trouble, Frenchie France, Raviolo Mafiosi, Antipodean Andy, and Peter Perfect. Like Super Punch-Out, it features a KO meter, allowing a more powerful punch to be thrown when the bar is filled.

Frank Bruno's Boxing was the sixth best-selling home video game of 1985 in the United Kingdom. Elite Systems later re-released the game as Frank Bruno's World Championship Boxing on their Encore budget label to coincide with the Mike Tyson vs. Frank Bruno bout of 1989.

Others
Great Tiger, Super Macho Man, and Vodka Drunkenski appear in the 1987 Nintendo Entertainment System version of Punch-Out!!. Vodka Drunkenski was renamed "Soda Popinski" in order to eliminate alcohol references in a family-oriented game.

The Super Punch-Out!! arcade inspired the development and release of Super Punch-Out!! for the Super Nintendo Entertainment System console in 1994.  Several elements were slightly changed for this version. Characters from both Punch Out!! arcade games are featured in the game with basically the same looks and attacks. including Bear Hugger, Dragon Chan, and Super Macho Man.

As in the original Punch-Out!! arcade, Mario, Luigi, Donkey Kong, and Donkey Kong Junior all appear in the audience part of the Super Punch-Out!! arcade. Also, one of the victory tunes heard in the Super Punch-Out!! arcade was later used in Nintendo's 1985 Baseball for the NES as the home run theme.

Notes

References

External links

 Super Punch-Out!! at arcade-history
Super Punch-Out!! at NinDB

1984 video games
Arcade video games
Video game sequels
Boxing video games
Punch-Out!!
Video games developed in Japan
Single-player video games
Nintendo arcade games
Video games featuring black protagonists